Trina A. Higgins is an American lawyer who has served as the United States attorney for the District of Utah since 2022.

Education

Higgins earned a Bachelor of Arts from Weber State University in 1992 and a Juris Doctor from the S.J. Quinney College of Law at the University of Utah in 1995.

Career

From 1995 to 2002, Higgins served as deputy district attorney in the Salt Lake County District Attorney's Office. She has served as an assistant United States attorney in the United States Attorney's Office for the District of Utah since 2002. Throughout her career, she has held various positions within the office including as tribal liaison from 2005 to 2015, chief of the violent crime section from 2008 to 2015, senior litigation counsel from 2015 to 2017, and special counsel to litigative programs from 2017 to 2021.

U.S. attorney for the District of Utah 

On January 26, 2022, President Joe Biden announced his intent to nominate Higgins to be the United States attorney for the District of Utah. On January 31, 2022, her nomination was sent to the United States Senate. On March 10, 2022, her nomination was reported out of the Senate Judiciary Committee. On April 27, 2022, her nomination was confirmed in the Senate by voice vote. She was sworn in on May 4, 2022.

References

External links

Living people
Year of birth missing (living people)
Place of birth missing (living people)
20th-century American women lawyers
20th-century American lawyers
21st-century American women lawyers
21st-century American lawyers
Assistant United States Attorneys
District attorneys in Utah
S.J. Quinney College of Law alumni
United States Attorneys for the District of Utah
Utah lawyers
Weber State University alumni